Bayne is a surname. Notable people with the surname include:

 Alexander Bayne (died 1737), first tenant of the chair of Scots law at the University of Edinburgh
 Beverly Bayne (1894–1982), American silent film actress
 Bill Bayne (1899–1981), American Major League Baseball pitcher
 Chris Bayne (born 1975), American former National Football League player
 Fiona Bayne (Felsie) (born 1966), Scottish curler, 1998 Winter Olympics participant
 Howard Bayne (basketball) (1942–2018), American basketball player
 Howard R. Bayne (1851–1933), American politician, lawyer and historian
 Hugh Aiken Bayne (1870–1954), American lawyer, judge and World War I officer
 John Bayne (disambiguation)
 Julia Taft Bayne (1845–1933), American author
 T. L. Bayne (1865–1934), American college sports coach and attorney
 Thomas McKee Bayne (1836–1894), American politician, lawyer and American Civil War Union colonel
 Thomas Vere Bayne (1829–1908), British academic at the University of Oxford
 Thomas Bayne (Sam Nixon) (1824–1888), American politician and former slave
 Trevor Bayne (born 1991), American NASCAR driver and Daytona 500 champion
 William Bayne (disambiguation)

Fictional characters 
 Russell Bayne, character in the movie Wolvesbayne

See also
 Bain (surname)
 James Baine (1710–1790), a minister of the second great secession from the Church of Scotland
 Baynes, another surname